Philologos is an etymology column about Yiddish, Hebrew and Jewish words and phrases.  It ran for 24 years in The Forward; since January 2015, it has run in Mosaic. It is written anonymously.

Mira Sucharov of Canadian Jewish News wrote in 2016 that "Philologos" is a pseudonym of Hillel Halkin and Edward Alexander expressed conviction in 2017 that Halkin was the column's author. Halkin later confirmed in 2021 that he penned it, describing it as possessing "independent status as a fictional character" he invented. Philologos, Halkin continued, "often says things or goes out on a limb by expressing crazy things" that Halkin "would never say."

See also
 On Language

References

Etymology
Jewish languages
Columns (periodical)